"Fine and Mellow" is a jazz standard written by Billie Holiday, who first recorded it on April 20, 1939 on the Commodore label. It is a blues lamenting the bad treatment of a woman at the hands of "my man".

Notable performances and recordings
The song was famously performed by Billie Holiday in 1957 in a television special, The Sound of Jazz. 
The line-up included several jazz legends (the first six are listed in the order of their solos):
 Ben Webster – tenor saxophone
 Lester Young – tenor saxophone
 Vic Dickenson – trombone
 Gerry Mulligan – baritone saxophone
 Coleman Hawkins – tenor saxophone
 Roy Eldridge – trumpet
 Doc Cheatham – trumpet
 Danny Barker – guitar
 Milt Hinton – double bass
 Mal Waldron – piano
 Osie Johnson – drums
It has been covered several times, sometimes with a change in lyrics or emphasis. For example, Lou Rawls switched the gender to a girlfriend and Eva Cassidy sang it in a defiant tone. Notable cover versions were sung by Nina Simone (on the 1959 At Town Hall), Dee Dee Bridgewater on her Billie Holiday tribute album, and Ella Fitzgerald on her eponymous album.

References

External links
 Fine and Mellow recording session
 Billie Holiday discography

Billie Holiday songs
Nina Simone songs
1939 songs
Songs written by Billie Holiday
Carmen McRae songs